Pablo Marcelo Trobbiani Carnesella (born 28 December 1976) is an Argentine football manager and former player who played as a centre midfielder.

Personal life
He is the son of the Argentine coach Marcelo Trobbiani.

References

External links
 
 
 
 Profile at En una Baldosa
 Profile at Futbol XXI 

1976 births
Living people
Argentine footballers
Argentine expatriate footballers
Boca Juniors footballers
Talleres de Córdoba footballers
Cobreloa footballers
Málaga CF players
CD Badajoz players
CE Sabadell FC footballers
A.S.D. Castel di Sangro Calcio players
Chilean Primera División players
Argentine Primera División players
Expatriate footballers in Chile
Expatriate footballers in Spain
Expatriate footballers in Italy
Expatriate football managers in Chile
Footballers from Elche
Association football midfielders
Argentine football managers
Guayaquil City F.C. managers
Manta F.C. managers
C.D. Olmedo managers